Vooruit (Dutch for Forward) is a Flemish social democratic political party in Belgium. The party was known as the Flemish Socialist Party (1978–2001: Socialistische Partij, SP; 2001–2021: Socialistische Partij Anders, SP.A) until 21 March 2021, when its current name was adopted.

The party was founded following the linguistic split of the Belgian Socialist Party in 1978, which also produced the Francophone Socialist Party. The Belgian Socialist Party itself consisted of former members of the Belgian Labour Party. From December 2011 to September 2014, the party was part of the Di Rupo Government, along with its Francophone counterpart. In 2020, it re-entered federal government as part of the De Croo Government. The party has been a part of the Flemish Government several times.

History

1885–1940

1940–1978

Since 1978 

The party was the big winner in the 2003 election, running on the SP.A–Spirit joint list (cartel) with the social-liberal party Spirit. Their share of the vote went up from 9% (of the total Belgian vote) to almost 15%, a second place in the number of votes. The main victim of this resurgence was the Green! party (formerly known as Agalev). SP.A was part of the "purple" federal coalitions of Prime Minister Guy Verhofstadt from 12 July 1999 until 10 June 2007, which contained both the Flemish and Francophone liberal and social-democratic parties.

In 2004, the SP.A along with its partner Spirit lost the elections for the Flemish Parliament. Although they won more seats in comparison to the Flemish elections of 1999, their percentage of the vote compared to the successful 2003 federal elections was considerably down. The reputation of then party leader Steve Stevaert took a beating too.

The party was briefly led by Caroline Gennez, after former president Steve Stevaert left to become governor of Limburg. Johan Vande Lanotte, who served as Minister of the Budget in the federal Government, was elected President and resigned as minister to become President on 17 October 2005. He resigned 11 June 2007, after SP.A–Spirit lost the elections for the federal parliament of 10 June 2007. In these federal elections, the cartel won 14 out of 150 seats in the Chamber of Representatives and 4 out of 40 seats in the Senate. Afterwards, Caroline Gennez was elected President by the party members.

As of May 2009, SP.A was in opposition in federal politics. Unlike its Francophone counterpart, the Socialist Party (PS), SP.A was not a participant in the Leterme II Government.

In January 2009, the party had apparently changed its name to Socialists and Progressive Differently (Dutch: Socialisten en Progressieven Anders). This name change was retracted and the party baseline was changed from Social Progressive Alternative (Dutch: Sociaal Progressief Alternatief) to Socialists and Progressive Differently (Dutch: Socialisten en Progressieven Anders).

In the 2010 federal election, SP.A won 13 seats with 9% of the overall vote. The party was a member of the Di Rupo Government formed on 6 December 2011, until the elections in 2014. In the elections for the Chamber of Representatives on 25 May 2014, SP.A scored again 9% and received 13 seats, in contrast to their francophone Socialist Party counterparts, who lost 3 seats and whose share of the vote decreased by 2%. In the Flemish Parliament, SP.A have 18 representatives, deriving from around 14% of the vote—this is a small reduction on the 2009 parliament, where SP.A had 19 seats, deriving from 15% of the popular vote. From 2009–2014, SP.A participated in the Flemish Government, in an uneasy coalition with the CD & V and the N-VA. From 2014 onwards, SP.A formed part of the opposition in Flanders, as the regional government reflected the Flemish component of the federal administration, consisting of coalition of the Open-VLD, CD & V and the N-VA.

In January 2018, the party advocated for a "new socialism" and a "new equality". In September 2020, party leader Conner Rousseau announced a renaming of the party to Vooruit ("Forward"). The new name was made official on 21 March 2021.

Presidents

Members holding notable public offices

European politics

Federal politics

Regional politics

Provincial politics 

° In Limburg, SP.A formed a cartel with Groen.

Electoral results

Chamber of Representatives

Senate

Regional

Brussels Parliament

Flemish Parliament

European Parliament

Symbols

Notes

References

Further reading 
 Johan Vande Lanotte (2010), Vlugschrift – over welvaart en geluk, (retrievable on the website sp.a-ledenbeheer), 96 p., .
 Patrick Vander Weyden, Koen Abts (2010), De basis spreekt — onderzoek naar de leden, mandatarissen en kiezers van sp.a (research on members sp.a by Ghent University), Acco (Leuven/Den Haag), 239 p., .

External links 
 
  (Dutch)

Political parties established in 1978
1978 establishments in Belgium
Flemish political parties in Belgium
Party of European Socialists member parties
Progressive Alliance
Social democratic parties
Socialist parties in Belgium
Pro-European political parties in Belgium